Baltimore Lifeboat Station is situated in Baltimore, Ireland and was established in 1919.

History 
The station was established in 1919 and a masonry lifeboat house and slipway were constructed at Bull Point. This was used for all of the station's lifeboats until 2012, being adapted and upgraded over the years for newer lifeboats. With the advent of the new , the decision was taken not to rebuild the boathouse to take the larger boat. Instead a mooring pen was dredged alongside the boathouse and the lifeboat is kept afloat. The boathouse has been reconfigured to provide enhanced crew facilities.

Notable rescues
In August 2011, the Baltimore lifeboat 'Hilda Jarret' was involved in the rescue of the yacht Rambler 100 that capsized south of the Fastnet Rock when taking part in the Fastnet Race. 21 crew, including its skipper, George David, were recovered either from the upturned hull, or from the water.

In October 1985, the lifeboat rescued the Irish Leader of the Opposition, Charles Haughey, when his yacht sank at the Mizen Head.

In August 1979, during the 1979 Fastnet race, the lifeboat rescued two yachts, Regardless and Marionette.

Fleet

All-Weather lifeboats

Inshore lifeboats

See also
List of RNLI stations

References

External links
- Baltimore Lifeboat Station Website

Sea rescue
Lifeboat stations in Ireland